This is an incomplete list of Waffen-SS units.

Waffen-SS armies

Waffen-SS corps
 I SS Panzer Corps
 II SS Panzer Corps
 III (Germanic) SS Panzer Corps
 IV SS Panzer Corps (formerly VII SS Panzer Corps)
 V SS Mountain Corps
 VI SS Army Corps (Latvian)
 VII SS Panzer Corps (see above ↑ IV SS Panzer Corps)
 VIII SS Cavalry Corps (planned in 1945 but not formed)
 IX Waffen Mountain Corps of the SS (Croatian)
 X SS Corps (made up of disbanded XIV SS Corps headquarters)
 XI SS Panzer Corps
 XII SS Corps
 XIII SS Army Corps
 XIV SS Corps – (see above ↑ X SS Corps)
 XV SS Cossack Cavalry Corps
 XVI SS Corps
 XVII Waffen Corps of the SS (Hungarian)
 XVIII SS Corps
 Serbian Volunteer Corps (classified SS by 1944)
 British Free Corps
 Free Corps Denmark

Waffen-SS divisions

 1st SS Panzer Division ''Leibstandarte SS Adolf Hitler''
 2nd SS Panzer Division ''Das Reich'' (previously SS ''Verfügungs'' Division, later SS Panzergrenadier Division ''Das Reich'')
 3rd SS Panzer Division ''Totenkopf'' (previously SS Panzergrenadier Division ''Totenkopf'')
 4th SS Panzergrenadier Division ''Polizei''
 5th SS Panzer Division ''Wiking'' (previously SS Panzergrenadier Division ''Wiking'')
 6th SS Gebirgs Division ''Nord'
 7th SS Freiwilligen Gebirgs Division ''Prinz Eugen''
 8th SS Cavalry Division ''Florian Geyer''
 9th SS Panzer Division ''Hohenstaufen''
 10th SS Panzer Division ''Frundsberg''
 11th SS Freiwilligen Panzergrenadier Division ''Nordland''
 12th SS Panzer Division ''Hitlerjugend''
 13th Waffen Gebirgs Division of the SS ''Handschar'' (1st Croatian)
 14th Waffen Grenadier Division of the SS (1st Ukrainian) (unofficially known as ''Galizien'')
 15th Waffen Grenadier Division of the SS (1st Latvian)
 16th SS Panzergrenadier Division ''Reichsführer-SS''
 17th SS Panzergrenadier Division ''Götz von Berlichingen''
 18th SS Freiwilligen Panzergrenadier Division ''Horst Wessel''
 19th Waffen Grenadier Division of the SS (2nd Latvian)
 20th Waffen Grenadier Division of the SS (1st Estonian)
 21st Waffen Gebirgs Division of the SS ''Skanderbeg'' (1st Albanian)
 22nd SS Freiwilligen Cavalry Division ''Maria Theresia''
 23rd Waffen Gebirgs Division of the SS ''Kama'' (2nd Croatian)
 23rd SS Freiwilligen Panzergrenadier Division ''Nederland'' (1st Dutch) (formed after the dissolution of the 23rd ''Kama'' division).
 24th Waffen Gebirgs Division of the SS (''Karstjäger'')
 25th Waffen Grenadier Division of the SS ''Hunyadi'' (1st Hungarian)
 26th Waffen Grenadier Division of the SS ''Hungaria'' (2nd Hungarian)
 27th SS Freiwilligen Grenadier Division ''Langemarck'' (1st Flemish)
 28th SS Freiwilligen Grenadier Division ''Wallonien''
 29th Waffen Grenadier Division of the SS (1st Russian)
 29th Waffen Grenadier Division of the SS (1st Italian) (formed after the disbanding of the 29th "1st Russian" division).
 30th Waffen Grenadier Division of the SS (2nd Russian)
 30th Waffen Grenadier Division of the SS (1st Belarusian)
 31st SS Freiwilligen Grenadier Division, variously reported as being named ''Böhmen-Mähren'' (Bohemia-Moravia) (this Division is not SS Kampfgruppe Division Bohmen-Mahren, this was a separate unit formed from training units in the protectorate after the ''Batschka'' Division) or ''Batschka''.
 32nd SS Freiwilligen Grenadier Division ''30 Januar''
 33rd Waffen Cavalry Division of the SS (3rd Hungarian)
 33rd Waffen Grenadier Division of the SS Charlemagne (1st French)
 34th SS Freiwilligen Grenadier Division ''Landstorm Nederland''
 35th SS Police Grenadier Division
 36th Waffen Grenadier Division of the SS ''Dirlewanger''
 37th SS Freiwilligen Cavalry Division ''Lützow''
 38th SS Grenadier Division ''Nibelungen''

Also:
 SS-Oberabschnitt Böhmen-Mähren (see above ↑ note)
 Panzer Division Kempf, a temporary unit of mixed Heer and Waffen-SS components.
 1st Cossack Cavalry Division
 26th SS Panzer Division (Brigade size only, Division title used as deception)
 27th SS Panzer Division (Brigade size only, Division title used as deception)

Waffen-SS brigades

 1st SS Infantry Brigade
 2nd SS Infantry Brigade
 3rd Estonian SS Freiwilligen Brigade
 4th SS Freiwilligen Panzergrenadier Brigade ''Nederland''
 5th SS Freiwilligen Sturmbrigade ''Wallonien'', see Walloon Legion
 6th SS Freiwilligen Sturmbrigade ''Langemarck''
 Sturmbrigade ''Reichsführer SS''
 8th SS Freiwillingen Sturmbrigade France
 SS Cavalry Brigade
 SS Brigade Westfalen
 Schutzmannschaft Brigade Siegling
 SS-Sturmbrigade ''Dirlewanger''
 SS Panzergrenadier Brigade 49 aka the 26th SS Panzer Division (Brigade size only, Division title used as deception)
 SS Panzergrenadier Brigade 51 aka the 27th SS Panzer Division (Brigade size only, Division title used as deception)
 SS Panzer Brigade 150
 SS Volunteer Grenadier Brigade ''Landstorm Nederland''

Waffen-SS foreign legions

 Armenische Legion (Armenian Legion)
 Azerbaijani SS volunteer formations
 British Free Corps
 Bretonische Waffenverband der SS
 Den Norske Legion aka Freiwilligen Legion Norwegen
 Estonian Legion
 Finnish Freiwilligen Battalion of the Waffen-SS
 Frikorps Danmark (Freikorps Denmark)
 Indische Legion (Indian Legion)
 ''Kaminski'' Brigade
 Latvian Legion
 SS Sturmbrigade ''Dirlewanger''
 Serbian Freiwilligen Corps
 Tatar Legion
 Waffen Grenadier Regiment of the SS (1st Bulgarian) (1944)
 Waffen Grenadier Regiment of the SS (1st Romanian) (1944)

Other Waffen-SS units
 101st SS Heavy Panzer Battalion
 102nd SS Heavy Panzer Battalion
 103rd SS Heavy Panzer Battalion
 500th SS Parachute Battalion
 600th SS Parachute Battalion
 SS Polizei Selbstschutz Regiment ''Sandschak''
 1st Belgrade Special Combat detachment

Military units and formations of the Waffen-SS
Waffen-SS
Waffen-SS
Waffen-SS
Waffen SS units